Michael James Grant Ireland (born 3 January 1974 in Winnipeg, Manitoba) is a Canadian long track speed skater.

Ireland specialises in the sprint distances (the 500 m and the 1000 m). He participated in the 500 m at the 1994 Winter Olympics (finishing 26th), the 500 m (6th) and 1000 m (14th) at the 2002 Winter Olympics and the 500 m (7th) at the 2006 Winter Olympics. Ireland was the 2001 World Sprint Champion, while winning several more medals at several World Championships (see the next section), and he also set a world record on the 1000 m (only to be broken 8 days later by compatriot Jeremy Wotherspoon).
In November 2008 Ireland suffered a severe injury in a World Cup event in Berlin. Later in the same meet teammate Wotherspoon broke his arm in seven places. In a span of two days Canada's two strongest sprinters were placed in serious jeopardy of not skating in the 2010 Olympics in their home country. Both skaters started the long road to recovery and in the 2010 Canadian Olympic trials both succeeded in their comebacks. 
Ireland qualified in the 500 and is a member of the Canadian 2010 Olympic speed skating team. He skated the fastest time of the trials 34.46 and set a personal best. Often skating in the shadow of his teammate Jeremy Wotherspoon, Ireland is the second most decorated Canadian in speed World Cup sprints.

Ireland was inducted into the Manitoba Sports Hall of Fame in 2012.

Medals
An overview of medals won by Ireland at important championships he participated in, listing the years in which he won each:

World records
Over the course of his career, Ireland skated one world record:

Source: SpeedSkatingStats.com

References

External links
 
 Mike Ireland at SpeedSkatingStats.com
 Mike Ireland at SpeedskatingResults.com
 
 
 
 

1974 births
Living people
Canadian male speed skaters
Speed skaters from Winnipeg
Olympic speed skaters of Canada
Speed skaters at the 1994 Winter Olympics
Speed skaters at the 2002 Winter Olympics
Speed skaters at the 2006 Winter Olympics
Speed skaters at the 2010 Winter Olympics
World record setters in speed skating
21st-century Canadian people